Ruth Kaps (born 20 February 1968 in Giessen) is a former German lightweight rower.

She competed at the 1996 Summer Olympics.

External links

 

1968 births
Living people
Sportspeople from Giessen
German female rowers
Rowers at the 1996 Summer Olympics
Olympic rowers of Germany
World Rowing Championships medalists for Germany
20th-century German women
21st-century German women